Greg Ip (born June 18, 1964) is a Canadian-American journalist, currently the chief economics commentator for The Wall Street Journal. A native of Canada, Ip received a bachelor's degree in economics and journalism from Carleton University in Ottawa, Ontario. He lives in Bethesda, Maryland.

Career

After graduating from Carleton, Ip began his journalism career as a reporter for The Vancouver Sun from May to December 1989. He then joined the Financial Post as an economics and financial reporter covering Canada in January 1990 and later transferred to Washington, D.C., as  a correspondent. In September 1995, he became a business and economics reporter for The Globe and Mail in Toronto.

Ip joined The Wall Street Journal in 1996, first as a reporter covering financial markets in New York and then as chief economics correspondent in Washington, D.C., where he created Real Time Economics. He left the Journal in 2008 to become the U.S. economics editor of The Economist and returned as chief economics commentator in January 2015.

In 2013 he spoke on CNBC in favor of low interest rates. He is the author of The Little Book of Economics: How the Economy Works in the Real World. Reviewers praised the book for its accessibility to non-economists and for demonstrating the relevance of economic theory to current events. Ip has studied the probabilities of various regions suffering economic crises.  In 2002, an article coauthored with John D. McKinnon was part of a set of ten articles that resulted in the Wall Street Journal staff being awarded a Pulitzer Prize for Breaking News Reporting.

Awards
 2008 - William Brewster Styles Award

Books
 Foolproof: Why Safety Can Be Dangerous and How Danger Makes Us Safe (2015)
 No Way Out?: Government Intervention and the Financial Crisis (2013) 
 The Little Book of Economics: How the Economy Works in the Real World (2010)

References

External links
 Greg Ip blog, Wordpress
 Gerald Loeb Awards: Past Finalists, UCLA Anderson School of Management
 "Greg Ip on the WSJ, the Economist, and Blogging," Portfolio, June 18, 2008
 

1964 births
Living people
American magazine editors
Carleton University alumni
Canadian expatriates in the United States
Canadian emigrants to the United States
Canadian journalists of Chinese descent
American journalists of Chinese descent
20th-century Canadian journalists
20th-century Canadian male writers
20th-century American journalists
American male journalists
20th-century American male writers
21st-century American journalists
21st-century American male writers